Gabrielė is a Lithuanian feminine given name. People bearing the name Gabrielė include:
Gabrielė Jankutė (born 1993), Lithuanian track cyclist
Gabrielė Leščinskaitė (born 1996), Lithuanian biathlete
Gabrielė Petkevičaitė-Bitė (1861–1943), Lithuanian educator, writer, and activist

Lithuanian feminine given names